San Agustín Tlacotepec is a town and municipality in Oaxaca in south-western Mexico. The municipality covers an area of 79.1 km². 
It is part of the Tlaxiaco District in the south of the Mixteca Region.

As of 2005, the municipality had a total population of 876.

References

Municipalities of Oaxaca